Frederick Emmett Felber (March 25, 1909 – May 1978) was an American football offensive tackle in the National Football League for the Boston Braves and the Philadelphia Eagles.  He played college football at the University of North Dakota.

1909 births
1978 deaths
People from Le Sueur, Minnesota
Players of American football from Minnesota
American football offensive tackles
North Dakota Fighting Hawks football players
Boston Braves (NFL) players
Philadelphia Eagles players